Frederick Hill was an English professional rugby league footballer who played in the 1900s and 1910s. He played at representative level for England, and at club level for Batley, as a forward (prior to the specialist positions of), during the era of contested scrums.

Playing career

International honours
Fred Hill won a cap for England while at Batley in 1909 against Wales.

County Cup Final appearances
Fred Hill played as a forward, i.e. number 12, in Batley's 0-21 defeat by Huddersfield in the 1909–10 Yorkshire County Cup Final during the 1909–10 season at Headingley Rugby Stadium, Leeds on Saturday 27 November 1909, in front of a crowd of 22,000, and played as a forward, i.e. number 11, in the  17-3 victory over Hull F.C. in the 1912–13 Yorkshire County Cup Final during the 1912–13 season at Headingley Rugby Stadium, Leeds on Saturday 23 November 1912, in front of a crowd of 16,000.

References

External links

Batley Bulldogs players
England national rugby league team players
English rugby league players
Place of birth missing
Place of death missing
Rugby league forwards
Rugby league players from Yorkshire 
Year of birth missing
Year of death missing